Roger Michael Cardinal Mahony  (born February 27, 1936) is an American cardinal and retired prelate of the Catholic Church who served as Archbishop of Los Angeles from 1985 to 2011. Before his appointment, he served as Auxiliary Bishop of Fresno from 1975 to 1980 and Bishop of Stockton from 1980 to 1985.

Born in the Hollywood district of Los Angeles and raised in the city's San Fernando Valley, Mahony was ordained to the priesthood in the Diocese of Monterey-Fresno in 1962. He was appointed auxiliary bishop of the Diocese of Fresno in January 1975 and consecrated bishop in March 1975. Mahony was then appointed Bishop of Stockton in 1980. In 1985, he was appointed Archbishop of Los Angeles by Pope John Paul II, and became the first Los Angeles native to hold the office. The pope created Mahony a cardinal in 1991, and he voted in the papal conclaves that elected Popes Benedict XVI and Francis.

During his tenure as Los Angeles archbishop, Mahony was instrumental in dividing the archdiocese into five administrative subdivisions and in guiding the construction of the Cathedral of Our Lady of the Angels, which opened in September 2002. Mahony has also been identified as a key figure in the cover-up of the Catholic Church sexual abuse scandal, where dozens of abusive priests were moved to other churches rather than prosecuted. In 2007, the Archdiocese of Los Angeles apologized for abuses by priests and announced a record-breaking settlement of $660 million for 508 victims.

In 2011, Mahony reached the mandatory retirement age for bishops and was succeeded by José Horacio Gómez on March 1. On January 31, 2013, Archbishop Gómez relieved Mahony of his public and episcopal duties in the Archdiocese of Los Angeles, following the release of personnel files documenting priests' sexual abuse during Mahony's tenure.

Biography

Early life 
Roger Mahony was born in the Hollywood district of Los Angeles, California, the son of Victor and Loretta (née Baron) Mahony, a second-generation Irish American couple. He has a twin brother, Louis, and an older brother, Neil. Roger Mahony attended St. Charles Borromeo Grammar School in North Hollywood, and at age 14 entered Los Angeles College, the junior seminary of the Archdiocese of Los Angeles.

Priesthood 
After studying at the Our Lady Queen of Angels Seminary and St. John's Seminary, Mahony was ordained to the priesthood on May 1, 1962 by Bishop Aloysius Willinger. Mahony graduated from Catholic University of America in 1964 with a Master of Social Work degree. For the next 13 years, Mahony held pastoral and curial assignments in the Diocese of Monterey-Fresno and the newly formed Diocese of Fresno. He also taught social work at Fresno State University in Fresno, California. Mahony was named a monsignor in February 1967.

Auxiliary Bishop of Fresno 

On January 7, 1975, Mahony was appointed as auxiliary bishop of Fresno and titular bishop of Tamascani by Pope Paul VI. He received his episcopal consecration on  March 19, 1975, from Bishop Hugh Donohue, with Bishops William Johnson and John Cummins as co-consecrators. That year, California Governor Jerry Brown appointed Mahony as the first chair of the California Agricultural Labor Relations Board, where he worked with the United Farm Workers and other growers to resolve labor disputes.

Bishop of Stockton 
On February 15, 1980, Mahony was appointed bishop of the Diocese of Stockton by Pope John Paul II, as announced by the nuncio, Jean Jadot. Mahony terminated two extern priests for sexual abuse during his tenure at Stockton.

Archbishop of Los Angeles and Cardinal-Priest 
On July 16, 1985, Mahony was appointed as archbishop of the Archdiocese of Los Angeles, the first Angeleno to hold the office. He was created Cardinal-Priest of Santi Quattro Coronati by Pope John Paul II in the consistory of June 28, 1991.

After the former Cathedral of Saint Vibiana was severely damaged in the 1994 Northridge earthquake, Mahony began plans to construct the Cathedral of Our Lady of the Angels, one of the largest Catholic churches in the United States. It was dedicated on September 2, 2002.

In 1987, Mahony presided over the controversial auction of an extensive collection of rare books, including a Gutenberg Bible, donated to St. John's Seminary by philanthropist and book collector Carrie Estelle Doheny.  The auction raised $37.8 million, publicly earmarked for an endowment for the training of new priests.  However, by 1996 some $23 to 25 million had been spent, including $1 million for a makeover of Mahony's living quarters.

In May 1998, Mahony announced he had been diagnosed with prostate cancer. He underwent a prostatectomy on June 15, 1998; doctors at the time indicated that the surgery was "successful" and were optimistic that he would not require additional treatment.

Mahony was one of the cardinal electors who participated in the 2005 papal conclave that selected Pope Benedict XVI, as well as the 2013 papal conclave that selected Pope Francis.

Civic involvement
Mahony was a board member of the Catholic University of America. He served on a number of committees of the United States Conference of Catholic Bishops, including those on Liturgy, Pro-Life Activities, and Migration & Refugees. He is still a consultant for the latter two committees. 

In the Vatican, Mahony was a member of the Pontifical Council for Justice and Peace (1984–1989) and the Pontifical Council for the Pastoral Care of Migrants and Itinerants (1986–1991). Mahony was also a member of the Pontifical Council for Social Communications (1989–2000), the Prefecture for the Economic Affairs of the Holy See (2000–2019), and the Congregation for Eastern Churches.

In 1992, Mahony published a pastoral letter Film Makers, Film Viewers on the topic of television news and the entertainment industry.

Mahony spoke out on provisions in immigration bills, such as the Sensenbrenner-King Bill, debated by Congress in late 2005 and 2006. He wrote to President George W. Bush that certain proposed measures would effectively outlaw the provision of charitable assistance and religious ministry to individuals not in valid immigration status. On Ash Wednesday, 2006, Mahony announced that he would order the clergy and laity of the Archdiocese of Los Angeles to ignore H.R. 4437 if it were to become law. Mahony personally lobbied US Senators Barbara Boxer and Dianne Feinstein to have the Senate consider a comprehensive immigration reform bill, rather than the enforcement-only bill that passed the House of Representatives. Mahony also blamed the US Congress for the illegal immigration crisis due to their failure to act on the issue in the previous 20 years, opposed H.R. 4437 as punitive and open to abusive interpretation, and supported S. 2611.

Retirement
On April 6, 2010, with Mahony due to reach his mandatory retirement age of 75 the following year, the Vatican under Pope Benedict XVI named San Antonio archbishop José Horacio Gómez as the coadjutor archbishop of Los Angeles with immediate right of succession to Mahony. Gómez succeeded Mahony on February 28, 2011, after the ceremony of transition held at the Cathedral of Our Lady of the Angels, with Mahony's resignation taking canonical effect on March 1, 2011.

In his retirement, Mahony intended to devote more time to advocacy on behalf of immigrants, an issue that he has supported for many years. He resides at his childhood parish in North Hollywood.

Controversies

Cathedral of Our Lady of the Angels
Many Catholics were upset about the non-traditional design and the amount of money that was spent on the new Cathedral of Our Lady of the Angels, although the parishes of the Archdiocese were not involved in the fund-raising.  Over $190 million was raised from foundations and individual donors. Mahony defended the expense of the new cathedral to replace the previous earthquake-damaged Cathedral of Saint Vibiana citing the need for a community to have a mother church and religious center that unites people in faith and spirituality.

Pastoral letter on the Mass
To prepare for the new Millennium, Mahony wrote a pastoral letter on the Mass entitled "Gather Faithfully Together: A Guide for Sunday Mass".  The letter called all parishes to plan and celebrate each Sunday mass in order to deepen the faith-life of all Catholics through the eucharist. Some, including televangelist Mother Angelica, found "Gather Faithfully Together" to be inconsistent with existing official liturgical directives set by the Catholic Church.

Vocations
The number of priestly vocations declined under Mahony's leadership.  By contrast, lay ministries grew and Mahony has said, "What some refer to as a 'vocations crisis' is, rather, one of the many fruits of the Second Vatican Council. It is a sign of God's deep love for the Church, and an invitation to a more creative and effective ordering of gifts and energy in the Body of Christ."

Sexual abuse cover-ups

In 1980, shortly after Mahony became Bishop of Stockton, California, a parent wrote to the diocese accusing Father Oliver O'Grady, a priest of the diocese, of molesting his two sons. Mahony had O'Grady transferred to another parish in 1982, where more abuse accusations followed. In 1984, a police investigation into accusations against O'Grady was closed after a diocesan lawyer promised that O'Grady would be kept away from children. In December 1984, Mahony transferred O'Grady to another parish. Mahony was promoted to Archbishop of Los Angeles the following year. In 1998, Mahony testified in a civil trial against the Diocese of Stockton, in which a jury awarded $30 million to two of O'Grady's victims. O'Grady was later the subject of the 2006 documentary film, Deliver Us from Evil.

On becoming archbishop of Los Angeles in 1985, Mahony was active in addressing sexual abuse cases. In 1988, the Archdiocese adopted a zero-tolerance policy.  In 1992, at a national meeting of Catholic bishops, Mahony publicly addressed the need to do more to combat sexual abuse in the church. In 2002, he directed that as many as 12 Southern California priests be expelled from the church due to sexual abuse, in compliance with the church's promises in a 2001 settlement.

In February 2004, the Archdiocese of Los Angeles issued the  Report to the People of God, containing a signed apology from Mahony. It included a detailed list of priests and circumstances in cases of known abuse. It described the development of diocesan policy related to sexual abuse, and case studies of accused priests that fully explored how awareness and understanding of their crimes unfolded. It included details of the most significant cases in the archdiocese's history, but did not include details of 33 priests who were accused but whose cases lacked confirmatory evidence. Despite strong criticism from media such as the Los Angeles Times, the church continued to block the release of details on these priests.

In 2007, the Archdiocese of Los Angeles apologized for abuses by priests and announced a record-breaking settlement of $660 million to 508 victims, an average of $1.3 million for each plaintiff. Mahony described the abuse as a "terrible sin and crime". The agreement settled all outstanding civil lawsuits against the archdiocese. The deal dwarfed the $157 million paid by the Archdiocese of Boston, where state law limits how much money non-profit groups can be required to pay.

In 2013, the archdiocese released memos Monsignor Thomas John Curry wrote to Mahony in 1986 and 1987 discussing potential legal accountability for priests, and recommending that priests should try to avoid using therapists who might report them to police. At the time, Mahony wrote the director of a New Mexico treatment center, seeking to prevent accused priests from returning to the archdiocese. Among the reasons he cited was to prevent lawsuits by victims who had been assured these priests would not be allowed to return to their parishes. 

In 2018, a petition was launched to remove Mahony from St. Charles Borromeo and to press criminal charges against him. On September 16, 2018, a group gathered in front of St. Charles Borromeo in North Hollywood, California to protest Mahony's involvement with cover-ups of the crimes.

In February 2020, Mahony was named as a defendant in a lawsuit where he was accused of shielding convicted ex-priest Michael Baker.

Removal from public duties
On January 31, 2013, in the wake of a court order requiring the Archdiocese of Los Angeles to release its unredacted files on clergy sexual abuse, Archbishop Gómez relieved Mahony of all of his remaining public and administrative duties. According to the archdiocese, Mahony remains "a priest in good standing" and may still celebrate Mass, but he may no longer speak publicly or exercise responsibilities ordinarily reserved for bishops, such as administering the sacrament of Confirmation.  Critics called Gómez's action "purely symbolic punishment" and "hand-slapping...a nearly meaningless gesture", and noted that Mahony remained "a powerful man" in the church. Three months later, after officiating at a confirmation service, Mahony told a Los Angeles Times reporter that it was "news to him" that he was not to be doing confirmations any longer, and said, "I've been doing them every week and I'm going to be doing them every week... So go home." 

Under canon law, as a cardinal, Mahony enjoys the "privilege of forum", meaning that only the pope is competent to judge and punish him in matters subject to ecclesiastical jurisdiction, and Gómez may only control Mahony's administrative assignments within the archdiocese. Following the resignation of Pope Benedict XVI, a number of Catholic groups voiced opposition to Mahony's voting in a papal conclave so soon after his censure; however, Mahony participated in the conclave in March 2013.

Child abuse lawsuit

In April 2021, Mahony was accused in a lawsuit of sexually molesting a teenage boy, though the suit has since been withdrawn.

See also

 Catholic Church hierarchy
 Catholic Church in the United States
 Historical list of the Catholic bishops of the United States
 List of Catholic bishops of the United States
 Lists of patriarchs, archbishops, and bishops

References

External links
 
 Mahony's blog
 Archdiocese of Los Angeles website
 Mahony's speech at the National Press Club, delivered May 25, 2000
 "Called By God To Help", editorial by Mahony in The New York Times, published 2006-03-22
 "Los Angeles Cardinal Hid Abuse, Files Show" New York Times, January 21, 2013

Episcopal succession

21st-century American cardinals
American Roman Catholic clergy of Irish descent
Roman Catholic archbishops of Los Angeles
Roman Catholic bishops of Stockton
Catholic Church sexual abuse scandals in the United States
Ecclesiastical passivity to Catholic sexual abuse cases
Cardinals created by Pope John Paul II
St. John's Seminary (California) alumni
Catholic University of America alumni
California State University, Fresno faculty
20th-century Roman Catholic archbishops in the United States
20th-century American cardinals
1936 births
Living people
Knights of the Holy Sepulchre
Members of the Order of the Holy Sepulchre
Bishops appointed by Pope Paul VI
Bishops appointed by Pope John Paul II
American Roman Catholic archbishops